Lupin the 3rd Part IV: The Italian Adventure, also known simply as , is a Japanese anime television series animated by Telecom Animation Film. Part of the Lupin III franchise, it is the fifth anime television adaptation of the Lupin III manga series created by Monkey Punch. The series aired from August to November 2015 on Italia 1 in Italy, and from October 2015 to March 2016 on Nippon TV in Japan. It started airing in the United States on Adult Swim's Toonami programming block in June 2017.

Plot
Most of the story takes place in Italy and San Marino, although some episodes are partly set elsewhere (e.g., France, Japan), with Lupin wearing a blue jacket.

Voice cast

Media

Manga
A manga adaptation by Naoya Hayakawa began publication on December 28, 2015. Titled , four volumes have been published by Futabasha as of November 28, 2016.

Anime

The series received its world premiere in Italy on August 30, 2015 on the Italia 1 and Italia 1 HD channels, and a preview screening at Concordia theater in San Marino on August 29, 2015. The Japanese premiere was on October 1, 2015 on NTV and the series was made available on the J:Com and Hulu services in Japan on October 21. It ran for 26 episodes in Italy and 24 episodes in Japan. The main theme song for the Italian version of the series, "Lupin, un ladro in vacanza" (Lupin, a thief on holiday) is performed by Italian hip-hop singer Moreno featuring Giorgio Vanni. The main theme song for the Japanese version of the series "Theme from Lupin III 2015" is composed by Yuji Ohno and performed by You & The Explosion Band. The ending theme for the Japanese version of the series  is performed by enka singer Sayuri Ishikawa and features lyrics written by Tsunku. It was released as a single with additional tracks in Japan on October 1, 2015. The series was released across DVD and Blu-ray releases by VAP in Japan between December 23, 2015 and July 20, 2016.

Crunchyroll began streaming the series as Lupin the Third - Part 4 on January 7, 2016. All episode previously broadcast in Japan were added at the same time. The series has been licensed by Anime Limited for the UK market and by Discotek Media for the North American market. The English dub, which was directed by Richard Epcar and Ellyn Stern, started airing in the United States on Adult Swim's Toonami programming block on June 18, 2017 and concluded on January 21, 2018. The dub, which was created as an adaptation of the Italian version, and the original Japanese version of the series have been released on home video separately in English-speaking markets due to the differences between the two versions. According to Anime Limited, these differences in video footage made it "simply not possible to include both language options" in one set. Discotek released the English dub in North America on Blu-ray on May 29, 2018, and on DVD on June 26, 2018, while the subtitled Japanese version was released on Blu-ray on April 30, 2019. On July 1, 2017, Funimation also started streaming a simuldub of the series with episodes airing every Sunday.

Production
The series was announced at Mipcom in Cannes, France, in October 2014 to be broadcast in spring 2015 in Italy, but was delayed to August. The series was produced by Telecom Animation Film, with franchise veteran Kazuhide Tomonaga serving as chief director and Yoichiro Yane directing with scripts by Yūya Takahashi. Yuji Ohno returned as series composer. Tomonaga's aim was to mix the opposing elements of the franchise and combine them into a series that is both hardboiled and comical, realistic and fantastical.

Reception
Daryl Surat of Otaku USA magazine refers to Part 4 as the "grand unification of Lupin styles" due to combining elements from several different eras of the franchise; "a bit dangerous like the originals, a bit silly like the 1980s 'pink jacket' Lupin, a bit bizarre like The Woman Called Fujiko Mine, a bit 'gentleman thief with a heart of gold' like Hayao Miyazaki's Cagliostro interpretation."

References

External links
 Official website 
 
 

Part 4
2015 anime television series debuts
Adventure anime and manga
Comedy anime and manga
Discotek Media
Nippon TV original programming
Television series set in 2014
Television series set in 2015
Television shows set in Italy
TMS Entertainment
Toonami